Bering Air is an American airline headquartered in Nome, Alaska, United States. It operates domestic scheduled passenger and charter airline services, as well as air ambulance and helicopter services. Its main base is Nome Airport, with hubs at Ralph Wien Memorial Airport (Kotzebue) and Unalakleet Airport.

History
In early 1975, Jim Rowe and three college friends embarked on a journey from northern Michigan, and traveled across America in a Cessna 195, landing in Mexico's Baja California peninsula, and eventually settling on the beaches of Nome, Alaska. A few years later, in September 1979, Bering Air was established. It commenced operations on October 3, 1979, with a single De Havilland Canada DHC-3 Otter. Later, in 1983, with instigation of the increasingly popular bypass mail system, the airline added other small aircraft, including the Piper Navajo, Beech 18, and Piper Seneca. Bering Air, in favor of modern, turbine powered aircraft, later phased out aircraft equipped with radial engines. Thus, the Beechcraft King Air 200, Beechcraft 1900D, Cessna Caravan, and CASA C-212 were introduced. Furthermore, off airport duties were transferred to helicopters, instead of older piston powered aircraft. In 2015, the airline upgraded its fleet with eight Cessna 208EX Grand Caravan aircraft replacing its older Cessna 208B aircraft. Today, the airline is wholly owned by Jim Rowe (President) and Christine Rowe.

In July 2020 Bering Air bought  at Ravn Alaska's bankruptcy auction the facilities in Aniak, Kotzebue, Nome and Unalakleet.

Fleet
As of January 2022, the Bering Air fleet consists of the following aircraft:

Retired fleet
Bering Air has previously operated the following aircraft:

Community services 
Bering Air, along with Grant Aviation, Frontier Flying Service, Northern Air Cargo, PenAir, and Ryan Air Services, participates in the Flying Can service, which allows rural Alaskan communities to recycle aluminum cans and now number 1 PET bottles in cooperation with Alaskans for Litter Prevention and Recycling.

Bering Air provides free delivery on scheduled flights for Airport Pizza, a pizzeria at Nome Airport that takes orders from remote locations served by Bering Air.

Destinations
Passenger and cargo charter services are flown from Kotzebue and Nome to destinations throughout the United States, and Russia.

Domestic
Bering Air offers scheduled passenger service to 29 cities in Western Alaska from hubs in Nome, Kotzebue and Unalakleet.

 Ambler (ABL) – Ambler Airport
 Brevig Mission (KTS) – Brevig Mission Airport
 Buckland (BKC) – Buckland Airport
 Cape Lisburne (LUR) – Cape Lisburne LRRS Airport
 Deering (DRG) – Deering Airport
 Elim (ELI) – Elim Airport
 Gambell (GAM) – Gambell Airport
 Golovin (GLV) – Golovin Airport
 Kiana (IAN) – Bob Baker Memorial Airport
 Kivalina (KVL) – Kivalina Airport
 Kobuk (OBU) – Kobuk Airport
 Kotzebue (OTZ) – Ralph Wien Memorial Airport
 Koyuk (KKA) – Koyuk Alfred Adams Airport
 Noatak (WTK) – Noatak Airport
 Nome (OME) – Nome Airport
 Noorvik (ORV) – Robert (Bob) Curtis Memorial Airport
 Point Hope (PHO) – Point Hope Airport
 St. Michael (SMK) – St. Michael Airport
 Savoonga (SVA) – Savoonga Airport
 Selawik (WLK) – Selawik Airport
 Shaktoolik (SKK) – Shaktoolik Airport
 Shishmaref (SHH) – Shishmaref Airport
 Shungnak (SHG) – Shungnak Airport
 Stebbins (WBB) – Stebbins Airport
 Teller (TLA) – Teller Airport
 Tin City (TNC) – Tin City LRRS Airport
 Unalakleet (UNK) – Unalakleet Airport
 Wales (WAA) – Wales Airport
 White Mountain (WMO) – White Mountain Airport

Former destinations
 Council (CIL) – Council Airport
 Diomede (DIO) – Diomede Island Airport (ice runway, winter only)
 Port Clarence (KPC) – Port Clarence Coast Guard Station

International
Bering Air offers charter service from Nome and Anchorage to Anadyr and Provideniya in the Russian Far East.

References

External links

 

1979 establishments in Alaska
Airlines established in 1979
Airlines based in Alaska
Companies based in Alaska
Nome Census Area, Alaska
Regional airlines of the United States